Mukhtar Bahadur oghlu Babayev (16 October 1967) is an Azerbaijani politician, Minister of Ecology and Natural Resources of Azerbaijan Republic.

Biography
Mukhtar Babayev was born on October 16, 1967 in Baku. He graduated from high school in Baku in 1984 and served in the military between 1986-1988. In 1991, he graduated from Moscow State University, Faculty of Philosophy, majoring in political science. In 1994, he received bachelor degree in Foreign Economic Relations of Azerbaijan State University of Economics. In 2000, he graduated from the specialty in World Economy of All-Russian Academy of Foreign Trade.

Political career
In 1991-1992 he worked at State Committee for Economy and Planning of Azerbaijan Republic. Mukhtar Babayev worked at Ministry of Foreign Economic Relations of Azerbaijan Republic in 1992-1993. From 1994 to 2003 he worked in Department of Foreign Economic Relations of SOCAR, from 2003 to 2007 he worked in Department of Marketing and Economic Operations of SOCAR. In 2007-2010, he served as SOCAR's Vice President for Ecology. In 2010-2018, he served as Chairman of the Supervisory Board of SOCAR "Azerkimya" Production Association.

In 2010 and 2015 M. Babayev was elected a deputy of National Assembly of Azerbaijan Republic. Since April 23, 2018, he is Minister of Ecology and Natural Resources of Azerbaijan Republic.

Mukhtar Babayev is a member of New Azerbaijan Party. On December 7, 2010, he was elected a member of Parliamentary Committee of National Assembly on Natural Resources, Energy and Ecology.

Awards
 Taraggi Medal — 19 September 2012
 Shohrat Order — 7 November 2017
 Order of the Rising Sun, 2nd Class, Gold and Silver Star — 29 April 2022

References

External links
 
 
 
 
 

1967 births
living people
Politicians from Baku
Azerbaijan State University of Economics alumni
Moscow State University alumni
New Azerbaijan Party politicians
Recipients of the Order of the Rising Sun, 2nd class